Steeple Claydon is a village and civil parish in the Buckinghamshire district of the ceremonial county of Buckinghamshire, England. The 2011 Census recorded the parish population as 2,278.

History
The toponym "Claydon" is derived from the Old English for "clay hill". The Domesday Book of 1086 records the area (including nearby Botolph Claydon, East Claydon and Middle Claydon) as Claindone. The affix "steeple" refers to the steeple of the Church of England parish church, which is prominent in the village. The manor of Steeple Claydon was once a royal possession. It was given as a wedding gift to Robert D'Oyly by King Henry I because D'Oyly was marrying one of the king's former mistresses. Later, after changing hands several times it came into the possession of King Edward IV when his grandfather the Earl of March left it to him. The manor house has since been pulled down. Thomas Chaloner, a regicide, had a school built in the village in 1656. This site was later made into the public library.

Present day
Steeple Claydon is now one of the largest villages in the Aylesbury Vale. It has two public houses, a Co-op supermarket, a bakery, a post office, a hairdresser, a fish & chips shop, a Chinese Takeaway, a dentist, a doctor's surgery and two garages. The village also has a successful football side, Steeple Claydon Football Club. The village has had some notable residents, including Florence Nightingale and professional footballers Sam Baldock and George Baldock.

The current Steeple Claydon School is a mixed, community primary school, which has roughly 166 pupils ranging in age from four to eleven.

References

Further reading

External links

Steeple Claydon Parish Council
Steeple Claydon Football Club
Steeple Claydon School Website

Villages in Buckinghamshire
Civil parishes in Buckinghamshire